Marshall Independent School District  is a  public 5A school district based in Marshall, Texas (USA) that serves nearly 6,000 students Pre-K through 12th Grade and 400 employees and staff.

In addition to Marshall, it also serves the surrounding communities of Nesbitt, Scottsville, and Woodlawn.

Institutions of higher learning in Marshall include, East Texas Baptist University, Wiley College, Texas State Technical College, and Panola College.

The school district was rated Academically Acceptable in the 2017 TEA accountability rating.

Schools

High School (Grades 9-12)
Marshall High School

Middle School (Grades 6-8)
Marshall Junior High (6-8)

Elementary schools
Price T. Young Elementary
Sam Houston Elementary (STEM)
David Crockett Elementary School
William B. Travis Elementary

Pre K/Head Start
Washington Early Childhood Center (Formerly Booker T. Washington Elementary)

Former MISD Campuses
Sam Houston Elementary (opened 1905; closed 1981; burned 2010)
Marshall Junior-Senior High (Former high school that was closed in 2017.)
J.H. Moore Elementary (Closed in 2017 and is now The Bridge of Compassion Resale Shop.)
Pemberton High School (Closed in 1988. Structure now part of Wiley College.)
Dogan (Closed in 1981 and now abandoned.)
Dunbar Elementary (demolished.)
Robert E. Lee Elementary
South Marshall Elementary (now used as Disciplinary Alternative Education Program And Little Mavs Daycare)
Isaac Van Zandt (Closed in 1981. Structure now part of ETBU)
Stephen F. Austin (Burned in 1969. Current site of Travis Elementary School.)
West End City School (Closed and demolished sometime during the 20th century.. On the same plot as the former Junior High)
Canaan Elementary School (A Rosenwald School that closed in 1963. Canaan Missionary Baptist Church is near the site.)
George Washington Carver Elementary (closed 2017)
Central High/Hillside School

Trinity Episcopal School
Marshall Christian Academy
Texas Early College High School

Notable graduates and staff of Marshall high schools
James Farmer
Sam B. Hall
Susan Howard
Lady Bird Johnson
Bill Moyers
Buddy Ryan, assistant coach in 1960
Terrance Shaw
Y. A. Tittle

External links
 Marshall ISD
Trinity Episcopal School
Marshall Christian Academy

Marshall
Education in Harrison County, Texas